is an animated television spin-off of the Astro Boy franchise created by Osamu Tezuka. Aimed at preschoolers, the series was executive produced by Something Big for Tezuka Productions.

The series had its global debut in China on MangoTV on August 2, 2019. In Japan, the series premiered on TX Network stations on October 3, 2019.

Production
During the 2014 Annecy International Animated Film Festival, Tezuka Productions announced it was developing new episodes of Little Astro Boy, an earlier iteration of the franchise aimed at preschool audiences. In 2016, it was revealed that this would be an entirely separate production under the same name created with France's Something Big. The series was later re-titled to Go Astro Boy Go! in 2018.

The international version of the show features an intro song composed by Norbert Gilbert and performed by Andy Chase. An instrumental of the track is used for the credits. The Japanese version of the series features a new theme song by Doberman Infinity called by ASTRO BOY ~ GO! GO! Atom ~. The Endless World by Transfer Girls is used for the end credits. On April 2, 2020, the new ending theme was performed by Girls² with a song called Zuttomo Heart Beats.

Voice cast

References

External links
 Official website  
 Go Astro Boy Go! page at TV Tokyo.jp 
 

Astro Boy
2010s French animated television series
French animated television spin-offs
French children's animated action television series
French children's animated space adventure television series
French children's animated comic science fiction television series
French children's animated drama television series
French children's animated science fantasy television series
French children's animated superhero television series
French preschool education television series
Japanese children's animated action television series
Japanese children's animated space adventure television series
Japanese children's animated comic science fiction television series
Japanese children's animated science fantasy television series
Japanese children's animated superhero television series
Anime-influenced Western animated television series
TV Tokyo original programming
Osamu Tezuka anime
Animated preschool education television series
2010s preschool education television series
Animated television series about children